was a Japanese idol duo in the late 1980s and early-to-mid-1990s composed of  and . They released their first single on April 27, 1988, and their final release was on March 31, 1996. Many of their singles topped the Oricon charts in Japan, including their biggest hit, "Samishii Nettaigyo".

History 
In 1987, Sachiko Suzuki and Shoko Aida both entered a beauty contest given by the magazine Up to bBoy. Suzuki won 7th place and formed Wink with 9th place winner Aida the next year, and in April they debuted with the single "Sugar Baby Love", a cover of an English song by The Rubettes. From that point on, many of Wink's early songs were covers of Western songs, but with Japanese lyrics; while many of their later songs were original works written by Japanese composers. 

"Sugar Baby Love" and their next single, "Amaryllis", did decently, but it wasn't until the release of their third single "Ai ga Tomaranai (Turn It into Love)" (a cover of Kylie Minogue's "Turn It Into Love") the next year that they became popular. It quickly became No. 1 on the Oricon charts, along with many of the singles that followed it. The duo's fifth single "Samishii Nettaigyo" won the Grand Prix at the 31st Japan Record Awards and landed them their first and only performance on NHK's Kōhaku Uta Gassen.

Wink had a different style and image than many other J-pop idols of the era who focused on a "cute" style with sugar coated lyrics. The duo had emotionless facial expressions while they sang, and almost never smiled. They also dressed in extravagant lolita fashions, and almost looked doll-like. This uniqueness in style distinguished them from their contemporaries and attributed to their success.

Decline and disbandment 
By the early 1990s, however, Wink's sales started to decline. Their singles rarely hit the No. 1 spot after early 1990, although they sold respectably until 1994. In the 1990s, many people were looking for fresher-sounding music, and Eurodance music became popular thanks to Tetsuya Komuro and the many artists he produced, many of them under the avex trax label. In 1995, Wink tried to generate more sales by putting out a Euro-style single, "Jive Into The Night ~Yaban na Yoru ni~", but it was a flop, only reaching No. 92 on the Oricon charts. Their next single, "Angel Love Story ~Aki-iro no Tenshi~", did somewhat better, but sales were still poor.

In February 1996, the duo were notified by their management that their activities were to be suspended on March 31. Suzuki and Aida had stated several times on TV that Wink had not officially disbanded, but was considered "inactive"; eventually, they admitted that Wink was in a de facto disbanded state.

Suzuki and Aida have reunited as Wink on every eighth year of each decade to celebrate the duo's anniversary. Their first reunion was on the 40th Japan Record Awards in 1998, followed by an appearance on TBS' New Year's Eve countdown special Koeru! Terebi on December 31, 1999. The duo celebrated their 20th anniversary on the 50th Japan Record Awards in 2008. In 2018, they celebrated their 30th anniversary by making appearances on NHK's Dai 50-kai Omoide no Melody special and the 60th Japan Record Awards.

Solo careers 
After Wink, Suzuki and Aida became TV personalities, although not often appearing together. They also continued recording music as solo singers; they released their first solo albums in 1992, and after the break-up, they released their first solo singles. Their solo music is quite different from the music they did as Wink; for example, Aida's music features a more Mediterranean style.

In 2004, Aida released a DVD and photobook called  with then-Morning Musume member Kaori Iida.

Aida married in 2008 and subsequently gave birth to a daughter in 2012.

Discography 

Studio albums
 Moonlight Serenade (1988)
 Especially for You: Yasashisa ni Tsutsumarete (1989)
 Twin Memories (1989)
 Velvet (1990)
 Crescent (1990)
 Queen of Love (1991)
 Sapphire (1991)
 Each Side of Screen (1992)
 Nocturne (Yasōkyoku) (1992)
 Aphrodite (1993)
 Brunch (1993)
 Overture! (1994)
 Voce (1994)
 Flyin' High (1995)

Filmography

Kōhaku Uta Gassen appearances

Bibliography 
 [Aug 10, 1989]  Double Tone (Pictorial)
 [Apr 10, 1990]  Twinkle Angels [TOTTEOKI NO Wink] (Book)
 [Sep 10, 1990]  WINKISSIMO (Pictorial)
 [Oct 5, 1991]  LEGEND (Pictorial)

References

External links 
 
 
 
 Wink at Oricon
 Wink at Idol.ne.jp

 
Japanese pop music groups
Japanese idol groups
Japanese girl groups
Japanese musical duos
Musical groups from Tokyo
Musical groups established in 1988
Musical groups disestablished in 1996